Amber Gambler is a metaphorical phrase and the title of a British public information film (PIF) from the 1970s, about the dangers of speeding through traffic lights before the amber changes to red "when there is ample time to stop", or in advance of it turning to green.

The Amber Gambler Twins is one of many public interest films trying to change the public's behavior.  It tries to induce a reflective moment leading to an "I see" epiphany.

Plot
As a voice-over narrates, a man is seen driving and ignoring amber traffic light signals, until the odds catch up with him and he strikes another "amber gambler". In getting out of his car to confront the other driver, the camera pulls back to reveal that the other person is himself.

The phrase has been popularly used to succinctly describe high risk driving behaviors that enhance the likelihood of automobile collisions, damage, injury and death.  It characterizes amber gambling as racing through amber lights at one end of the cycle or the other.

Other uses
In the early 1990s, the term became popular with ufologists in describing mysterious orange lights sighted around crop circle sites.

The term was used during the COVID-19 pandemic to refer to holidaymakers arranging travel to restricted destinations in the hope that the restrictions were lifted before or during their holiday.

See also
 Red light running
 Driving without due care and attention

References

External links

 Amber Gambler Twins 40-second safety commercial from 1977 YouTube

Public information films
1970s educational films
1970 films
British educational films